Esterhuysenia is a genus of flowering plants belonging to the family Aizoaceae.

Its native to the Cape Provinces of South Africa.

The genus name of Esterhuysenia is in honour of Elsie Elizabeth Esterhuysen (1912–2006), a South African botanist, and it was first described and published in J. S. African Bot. Vol.33 on page 308 in 1967.

Known species:
Esterhuysenia alpina 
Esterhuysenia drepanophylla 
Esterhuysenia inclaudens 
Esterhuysenia knysnana 
Esterhuysenia mucronata 
Esterhuysenia stokoei

References

Aizoaceae
Aizoaceae genera
Plants described in 1967
Flora of South Africa
Taxa named by Louisa Bolus